This is a list of endangered languages of the Pacific, based on the definitions used by UNESCO.

An endangered language is a language that it is at risk of falling out of use because there is little transmission of the language to younger generations. If a language loses all of its native speakers, it becomes an extinct language.

Australia 

According to the 2016 census, English is the only language spoken in the home for close to 72.7% of the population. The next most common languages spoken at home are Mandarin (2.5%), Arabic (1.4%), Cantonese (1.2%), Vietnamese (1.2%) and Italian (1.2%). A considerable proportion of first- and second-generation migrants are bilingual.

Federated States of Micronesia

Indonesia 

The UNESCO Atlas of the World's Languages in Danger lists 88 endangered languages in Indonesia.

Melanesia

New Caledonia 

The following languages of New Caledonia may be considered endangered.

Papua New Guinea

Solomon Islands

Vanuatu

Palau

Polynesia 

The following Polynesian languages considered endangered are mostly Polynesian outliers spoken by tiny minorities.

Other

References 

Pacific
 
Endangered languages